Fort Loudon (CDP) is an unincorporated community and census-designated place (CDP) in Peters Township, Franklin County, Pennsylvania, United States. As of the 2020 census, the population was 895.

History
The community is named after the colonial Fort Loudoun, built in 1756 during the French and Indian War. A replica of the fort, built in 1993, stands at the corner of US 30 and Brooklyn Road North, at the southeastern corner of the CDP.

A post office called Loudon was established in 1814, and the name was changed to Fort Loudon in 1883.

Geography
Fort Loudon is located in western Franklin County in the valley of the West Branch Conococheague Creek, with Cove Mountain to the west, Blue Mountain to the north, and Parnell Knob to the east. U.S. Route 30, the Lincoln Highway, passes through the community, leading west  to McConnellsburg and east  to Chambersburg, the Franklin County seat. Pennsylvania Route 75 crosses US 30 southwest of the town center, leading north up the Path Valley to  Fannettsburg and south  to Mercersburg.

Demographics

References

Census-designated places in Franklin County, Pennsylvania
Census-designated places in Pennsylvania